India national rugby union team is a national team that represents India in the international rugby championships and matches. It is governed by Rugby India organization which is recognised by Ministry of Youth Affairs and Sports of government of India.

It was admitted to the IRB in 2001, but it took three years before India won a match, beating Pakistan 56–3 in the third tier competition of the Asian Biennial tournament.

In 2005, they started their attempt to qualify for the 2007 Rugby World Cup, but a 22–36 loss to Kazakhstan sent them out of the running for that tournament. They also were disappointed with an 8–8 tie in Guam, but still managed to finish second in their group of four teams thanks to beating Malaysia 48–12. However, as only the top team in the group qualified for the next stage, India were out.

History 

Rugby Union in India dates back to a scratch match or two played in Calcutta and Madras during the visit of MS Galatea in 1871. The first recorded match was played on Christmas Day 1872, at CFC in Kolkata, it was played between England and a combined team of Scotland, Ireland and Wales.

The national team was not started until 1998 however when the India national team played Singapore in Singapore, they lost 85-0. The team were then admitted into the International Rugby Board in 2001 and then in 2003 the team undertook its first UK tour. This consisted of playing three sides from the Midlands which all resulted in large defeats, including a staggering 153-0 defeat from a Leicester Tigers XV at Welford Road. They also failed to score a single try during their visit. Despite the sheer lack of success, the head did have some positive words, stating: "It's all a learning process for us. The difference in size and body weight between the two teams was huge, but when we get back to Asia we'll be playing against teams roughly our own size." In 2007 India attempted to qualify for the 2007 Rugby World Cup in France, Scotland, and Wales. They were placed in Asian Division 3, Pool B for the qualifiers in which India finished second of four teams with 1 win, 1 tie, and 1 loss. As only the first place team moved on to the second qualification round India was officially knocked out of the 2007 World Cup.

In 2008 the India Rugby Union Team attempted to qualify for the Rugby World Cup again. This time though qualification was different as instead of the group stage India had to play in the 2008 Asian Five Nations and win it in order to move on to Round 2 in qualification. India though lost their first match against Thailand and had to settle for 3rd place after a 2nd place match win against Pakistan in which India achieved their biggest ever victory as they beat Pakistan 92–0.

In 2019, South Africa legend and former South Africa national rugby union team player Nass Botha became the head coach of Indian men's and women's national teams. Under his supervision Rugby India held practice sessions, tryouts in different part of the India. As per Botha India have to play at least 10-12 matches per year per season. India have 1.3 billion people, the country can form a competitive national team. 800 schools in the country have rugby 7 teams, these schools also have to make 15 players teams, It will increase talent pool. Even if 50-100 started their 15 player side.

Stadium

India does not have its own personal stadium to use. When they play they usually do on local university fields throughout India.

Strip
India have worn dark blue and black for all of their Rugby Union games since 2011 and prior to that, from 1998–2010, they used the traditional Indian sports colours of light blue and white. At present, the shirt and socks are dark blue and the shorts are black.

Record

Asia Rugby Championship
India competes annually in the Asia Rugby Championship, which is a rugby union competition held amongst national rugby sides within the Asia Rugby region. India participated in the inaugural 2008 Asian Five Nations (as it was then known) competing in the Second Division, finishing in third place, and missing out on being promoted. During the 2009 Asian Five Nations India again finished in 3rd place in the Second Division but then during the 2010 Asian Five Nations India just lost out on promotion to Division 1 when they were beaten 34–12 by the Philippines in the final game. They then suffered a setback in 2011 Asian Five Nations as they were relegated to Division 3 after losing both their matches in Second Division tournament. In 2012 India were successful in winning the Third Division tournament earning a promotion back to Division 2 the following year. In 2013 they finished fourth in the Second Division tournament, relegating them back to the third division. In 2014 the Division 3 tournament was split into an East and West competition, with four teams in each. India finished in fourth place in the Division 3 West tournament. In 2015 the Division 3 tournament was split into three brackets, East, West and Central, with three teams in each. India competed in the Central tournament, however due to the withdrawal of Pakistan the remaining teams India and Uzbekistan played two matches against each other. As both team scored respective victories India was declared the winner on points difference. In 2016 the Division 3 tournament was split into four competitions, East, Central, West and West-Central. India plays in the South-Central bracket where it is scheduled to compete against Pakistan.

World Cup
India has never played in the Rugby World Cup but they have attempted twice in 2005 and 2008 to qualify for the 2007 Rugby World Cup and 2011 Rugby World Cups respectively.

Overall records

The Test match record against all nations, updated to 25 November 2022, is as follows:

Recent matches
Matches played in the last 12 months.

Squad
Squad to 2022 Asia Rugby Championship Division 3 South

Head coach:

See also 

 History of rugby union 
 Sport in India 
 Rugby World Cup 
 All blacks

References

External links
 The Official Website of Indian Rugby
 IRB World Rankings
 Indian Rugby Internationals
 2007 Rugby World Cup qualifying procedures 
 2007 Rugby World Cup results

 
Asian national rugby union teams